Diogo de Sousa Ribeiro (born 14 January 1991) is a Portuguese professional footballer who plays as a forward for Alverca.

Club career
Born in Coimbra, Ribeiro finished his development at local Associação Académica, but did not represent the club officially in his first spell. In the 2011–12 season he shone for Sertanense F.C. in the third division, scoring 16 goals in 32 matches and subsequently securing a contract with S.C. Braga.

Ribeiro only represented the B team during his two-year spell in Minho, also being loaned to Segunda Liga side C.D. Aves in January 2013. On 21 June 2014, he signed a one-year deal with Lechia Gdańsk from the Polish Ekstraklasa, but he returned to his country after only a few months, joining C.F. Os Belenenses. He made his debut in the Primeira Liga on 7 March 2015, coming on as a late substitute in a 1–1 away draw against Vitória de Setúbal.

In the summer of 2015, Ribeiro was loaned for one season to second-tier club C.D. Mafra. The following January, in the same situation, he moved to S.C. Covilhã in the same league.

References

External links

1991 births
Living people
Sportspeople from Coimbra
Portuguese footballers
Association football forwards
Primeira Liga players
Liga Portugal 2 players
Segunda Divisão players
Associação Académica de Coimbra – O.A.F. players
G.D. Tourizense players
Sertanense F.C. players
S.C. Braga B players
C.D. Aves players
S.C. Braga players
C.F. Os Belenenses players
C.D. Mafra players
S.C. Covilhã players
C.D. Santa Clara players
F.C. Vizela players
Lechia Gdańsk players
F.C. Alverca players
Portugal youth international footballers
Portuguese expatriate footballers
Expatriate footballers in Poland
Portuguese expatriate sportspeople in Poland